The Story is the debut studio album by South Korean singer and songwriter Kang Daniel. It was released on May 24, 2022, by Konnect Entertainment and distributed by Sony Music Korea. The Story contains ten tracks with "Upside Down" as its lead single. A repackage of the album, titled The Story: Retold, was released on November 24, 2022. Three new songs and two iterations were added to the track listing with "Nirvana" as its lead single.

Background and composition
On May 2, 2022, Konnect Entertainment posted a surprise comeback trailer video for what would be Kang Daniel's first full-length album The Story, set for release on May 24. Two days later, pre-orders for three different versions (Arch-Plot, Anti-Plot, and Non-Plot) of the album began. Serving as the storyteller,  Kang is credited as the main lyricist of all of the album's songs. Having previously revealed the purpose behind his color series as wanting to share "the different stages of self-discovery as an artist with [his] fans", Kang noted that he now feels "[his] own color has been established" through all that he has released thus far. Yellow was based on Kang's personal experiences and revolved around inner sanctity, which forced confrontation. Subsequently, The Story acts as "the balm to soothe yourself in the aftermath of laying yourself bare".

A repackage of the album, titled The Story: Retold, was released on November 24, 2022. The reissue includes five new tracks along with the original 10-song track list that is rearranged in a way that "adds completeness to the plot".

Promotion
A press conference was held on May 24 at the Grand InterContinental Seoul Parnas for the release of Kang's first full-length album. To further commemorate the album's release, he held an album countdown V Live show on the same day as well as both offline and virtual fan-sign events. He also made an appearance on the May 27 episode of the third season of Sixth Sense with Noh Sa-yeon and the May 29 episode of MBC's Blockbuster. Following a week of promotions, Konnect announced that Kang would be taking a break after being diagnosed with spinal disc herniation due to the b-boy performance included in the music video for "Upside Down" and subsequent music show performances.

Commercial performance
The Story surpassed 316,630 physical album sales within a week. Lead single "Upside Down" peaked at number two on the Gaon Digital Chart for the chart issue dated May 22 to 28 in 2022.

Critical reception
Bollywood entertainment website Bollywood Hungama included the album in a list titled "20 Best B-side Korean Songs of 2022" where Nandini Lyengar said Kang "stands firm on his promise of delivering the best". In an article collecting Brazilian entertainment website Omelete's favorite albums of 2022, Kang's catalogue of music was described as having a theatrical edge that was enhanced with the release of The Story and its repackage The Story: Retold due to the composition, music video, and choreography attached to the different tracks of the album. Writing for the publication, Caio Coletti highlighted certain tracks by describing "Parade" as "a melodically mesmerizing elegy" and "Nirvana" as "evoking an intoxicating urban romance".

Live performances
Kang performed "Parade", the fourth track of the album, on the June 16 episode of The Kelly Clarkson Show as the first K-pop male solo artist to appear on the variety talk show. This marked his US television debut with host Kelly Clarkson introducing him as "one of the most successful K-pop solo acts to date".

Track listing

Charts

Weekly charts

Monthly charts

Year-end charts

Release history

References

2022 debut albums
Kang Daniel albums
Korean-language albums
Sony Music albums
Konnect Entertainment albums